The 1988 San Jose Earthquakes season was their fifteenth overall, and the club's fourth in the Western Soccer Alliance. 
The Earthquakes finished the season in third place and reached the final in the playoffs, losing 5–0 to the Seattle Storm.

Squad
The 1988 squad

Competitions

Western Soccer Alliance

Match results

Season

Playoffs 

* = Penalty kicksSource:

Standings 

Points system: Six points per win.  One point per goal up to three points per game.

References

External links
The Year in American Soccer – 1988 | WSA
San Jose Earthquakes All-time Game Results | Soccerstats.us

San Jose Earthquakes seasons
San Jose
1988 in sports in California